Alexander Miljković (born 1975 in Belgrade) is a Serbian classical doublebassist.

Biography
After finishing his music high school in 1994, he studied bass at the University of Arts in Belgrade, the Interlochen Center for the Arts in Michigan, the Royal Swedish Academy of Music and the Conservatorio Superior de Musica de Salamanca.

Composing career
Miljković has published three books. The second book is an official textbook in Republic of Srpska Ministry of Education. First book is double bass pieces and third book is: "From music to sport".He wrote concert for solo double bass and orchestra:"Trio Olivera".He has also published 15 CDs. He is accepted in Africa sports & entertainment hall of fame. Alexander with his mother Olivera received the title of honorary citizen of Ostrikovac.He composed official music for Mediterranean Games.He published music cd in Cuba for boxer Teofilo Stevenson. Also composed official music for Southeast Asian Mathematical Olympiad (SEAMO). He has composed music for a number of sport clubs. These include CD for many sport sections of Red star Belgrade. Music for Switzerland handball hall of fame and CD for Belgrade chess association. Also music for football clubs FK VGSK, FK Karađorđe, Real Emirate FC (Ghana), football club and sport society BASK, FK Radnicki Belgrade, ex football club BSK (1911-1945) FK BSK Batajnica, OFK Petrovac, FK Bor, FK Hajduk Veljko and FK Kosanica and official music for league of future champions (football in Serbia) and for Vietnam football national team and for 18 more football clubs. Also official music for city race in Ćuprija and official music for canoe European championship 2018 in Belgrade and for Radio Belgrade and Radio Television Kuršumlija. Official music for place Grgure and Lučani and Pučišća and Kostunici and Srbac, newspaper: Politikin zabavnik also for NIN award. He published the CD for school Vuk Karadzic in Belgrade. He played for the Belgrade chamber group Simfonieta during 1998 and has played as a guest on many TV shows. In 1999 he was one of the student representatives on the Nobel Prize.

He has performed in several solo concerts and other public appearances in Serbia, and abroad in the United States, Sweden, Spain, Croatia and in Austria, Vienna, sponsored by the Ministry of Culture Republic of Serbia.

Tutor
Miljković has taught bass at MS Stankovic since 2002 and at the Academy of Fine Arts in Belgrade. He is also professor of double bass at International Academy of Music, Pučišća, Croatia, since 2013. His students have performed at the Cultural Center of Belgrade, Student Cultural Center, the stadium of Red Star Belgrade and a concert for the "Museum Night" event, as well as numerous guest appearances on TV and radio shows.

References

Further reading
"Politika" newspaper; Culture column: "Contrabass music in Serbia" from 22.11.2008.

External links
News article about Aleksandar Miljković (in Serbian)

1975 births
Living people
Serbian classical musicians
21st-century double-bassists